O'Bil Bil is a rural locality in the North Burnett Region, Queensland, Australia. In the  O'Bil Bil had a population of 29 people.

Geography
The Burnett Highway forms the eastern and northern boundaries, and the Burnett River forms part of the western boundary.

History 
The locality is named after the O'Bil Bil Creek, a tributary of the Burnett River.

Malmoe State School opened in August 1914. In 1928 it was renamed O'Bil Bil State School. It closed circa 1964.

O'Bill Bill Creek State School opened in January 1916. In 1925 it was renamed Cattle Creek Valley State School. It closed on 12 March 1971.

In the  O'Bil Bil had a population of 29 people.

References 

North Burnett Region
Localities in Queensland